The Partnership Act 1890 (c. 39) is an Act of the Parliament of the United Kingdom which governs the rights and duties of people or corporate entities conducting business in partnership. A partnership is defined in the act as 'the relation which subsists between persons carrying on a business in common with a view of profit.'

Main provisions
A partnership can arise through conduct, oral agreement, or a written contract known as a partnership agreement. The minimum membership is two and the maximum is unlimited since 2002. The provisions of the Partnership Act 1890 apply unless expressly or implicitly excluded by agreement of the partners. Each partner is entitled to participate in management, get an equal share of profit, an indemnity in respect of liabilities assumed in the course of business and the right to not be expelled by other partners. A partnership ends on the death of a partner, unless an agreement is made prior to the deaths.

Complexities

Liability of partners
In England partners are jointly liable for the debts and obligations of the firm whilst they are a partner. Where a partner has died, their estate also becomes severally liable. In Scotland partners are both jointly and severally liable. Where there has been a wrongful act or omission, or a misapplication of money or property in receipt, every partner is jointly and severally liable.

See also
United Kingdom partnership law
Limited Liability Partnerships Act 2000

Notes

External links

English law
United Kingdom Acts of Parliament 1890